Clinton High School and Public Library, also known as Roosevelt School, is an historic structure located in Clinton, Iowa, United States.  It was listed on the National Register of Historic Places in 2012.

History
Clinton architect Josiah L. Rice designed the building in the Romanesque Revival style. The building housed Clinton High School from 1889 until 1922.  It also served as the Clinton Public Library until 1904.  After a new high school was built, the building became the office of the superintendent and Roosevelt Elementary School and served that purpose until 1974. The Clinton Community School District used the building as its administration center until they moved out in 2013.   The building has been turned into 16 apartments, 12 of which are income-restricted and four are market-rate.  Community Housing Initiatives of Spencer, Iowa was responsible for the $4.8 million project that was completed in October 2016.

Architecture
The former school building is a 2½-story brick structure built on a stone foundation. Stone was also used for the window sills, string courses, arches and trim.  Previous to its 2016 renovation, smaller windows with infill panels had replaced the original windows.  The window openings above the roof cornice line were boarded up. All the windows in the building have been reopened to their original forms.  The steel fire escape on the north wall was also a later addition.  The interior featured open stairwells and wood wainscoting.

References

School buildings completed in 1889
Romanesque Revival architecture in Iowa
Buildings and structures in Clinton County, Iowa
Former library buildings in the United States
Former school buildings in the United States
School buildings on the National Register of Historic Places in Iowa
Libraries on the National Register of Historic Places in Iowa
National Register of Historic Places in Clinton County, Iowa
Defunct schools in Iowa